Michael Bickford is an American businessman. He is the founder of Round Hill Capital, a real estate investment firm.

Early life
Michael Bickford was born in Greenwich, Connecticut. His father, who was a polo player, owns a farm in Vermont. He graduated from Vanderbilt University in Nashville, Tennessee.

Career
Michael has over 18 years experience in private equity real estate. From 1995 to 2002, he worked as an acquisition professional for the Morgan Stanley Real Estate Funds. In 2002, he founded Round Hill Capital, a real estate investment firm which has invested approximately $6 billion of capital in European real estate since its inception. His company attracted attention in Ireland for a proposed deal to buy homes there, a deal that was later withdrawn following criticism.

Personal life
Michael plays high goal polo competitively in England, Spain, France and the United States. He started playing at a young age with his father in Vermont, and today plays against the top players in the world by competing in the Queens Cup, British Open, Gold Cup in Spain, and the high goal tournaments in Wellington, Florida. La Indiana is the team name and is considered one of the most competitive teams in the world today. Bickford won the Amateur Most Valuable Player award in 2021. He resides in Palm Beach, Florida where he is founder of private members club Carriage House.

References

7. https://www.townandcountrymag.com/leisure/a39481348/carriage-house-palm-beach-opening/ Town and Country Magazine March 31 2022.

8. https://www.irishtimes.com/business/2022/11/29/uk-liquidation-will-not-hit-round-hills-irish-operation/ The Irish Times November 29 2022.

Vanderbilt University alumni
American businesspeople
Morgan Stanley employees
American polo players
20th-century births
Living people
Year of birth missing (living people)
People from Greenwich, Connecticut